Fairhaven Town Hall is the town hall of Fairhaven, Massachusetts.  It is located at 40 Center Street, between Walnut and William Streets, across Center Street from the Millicent Library.  The brick and stone High Victorian Gothic hall was designed by Charles Brigham and built in 1892.  It was given to the town by Henry Huttleston Rogers, who also made other significant contributions to the town, including the library.  The building's granite trim elements were quarried in St. George, New Brunswick and Red Beach, Maine.

The town hall was listed on the National Register of Historic Places in 1981 and has had a preservation restriction on it since 1998.

See also
National Register of Historic Places listings in Bristol County, Massachusetts

References

City and town halls on the National Register of Historic Places in Massachusetts
Buildings and structures in Bristol County, Massachusetts
Town halls in Massachusetts
Clock towers in Massachusetts
Fairhaven, Massachusetts
National Register of Historic Places in Bristol County, Massachusetts
1892 establishments in Massachusetts
Government buildings completed in 1892